This is a list of members of the Tasmanian House of Assembly between the 23 November 1946 election and the 21 August 1948 election. The Nationalist Party had dissolved and its members had joined the new Liberal Party by the time of the election.

Notes
  Labor MHA for Franklin, Edward Brooker, died on 18 June 1948. A recount on 28 June 1948 resulted in the election of Labor candidate John Harold Brown—as it turned out, Brown served the shortest term of any MHA, of just seven weeks.

Sources
 
 Parliament of Tasmania (2006). The Parliament of Tasmania from 1856

Members of Tasmanian parliaments by term
20th-century Australian politicians